The 2005 AIG Japan Open Tennis Championships was a tennis tournament played on outdoor hard courts. It was the 32nd edition of the event known that year as the AIG Japan Open Tennis Championships, and was part of the International Series Gold of the 2005 ATP Tour, and of the Tier III Series of the 2005 WTA Tour. Both the men's and the women's events took place at the Ariake Coliseum in Tokyo, Japan, from 3 October through 9 October 2005. Wesley Moodie and Nicole Vaidišová won the singles titles.

Finals

Men's singles

 Wesley Moodie defeated  Mario Ančić, 1–6, 7–6(9–7), 6–4 
 It was Moodie's 1st title of the year and the 1st of his career.

Women's singles

 Nicole Vaidišová defeated  Tatiana Golovin, 7–6(7–4), 3–2, retired
 It was Vaidišová's 2nd title of the year and the 4th of her career.

Men's doubles

 Satoshi Iwabuchi /  Takao Suzuki defeated  Simon Aspelin /  Todd Perry, 5–4(7–3), 5–4(15–13)
 It was the first and only title for both Iwabuchi and Suzuki.

Women's doubles

 Gisela Dulko /  Maria Kirilenko defeated  Shinobu Asagoe /  María Vento-Kabchi, 7–5, 4–6, 6–3

References

External links
 Official website
 ATP tournament profile

AIG Japan Open Tennis Championships
AIG Japan Open Tennis Championships
Japan Open (tennis)
 
Tennis Championships
AIG Japan Open Tennis Championships